Hélène Dubreuil (born 14 May 1967) is a French set decorator. In 2012, she was nominated for an Academy Award for the film Midnight in Paris. She shared her nomination with Anne Seibel.

References

External links

Living people
Set decorators
1967 births
Place of birth missing (living people)